Eder Gilmar Arias Angulo (born 11 April 1983) is a Colombian footballer who plays as defender.

References

1983 births
Living people
Footballers from Cali
Colombian footballers
Association football defenders
América de Cali footballers
Cortuluá footballers
Atlético Colegiales players
W Connection F.C. players
Platense F.C. players
C.D. Victoria players
C.D. Águila footballers
Categoría Primera A players
Categoría Primera B players
Liga Nacional de Fútbol Profesional de Honduras players
Primera División de Fútbol Profesional players
Colombian expatriate footballers
Expatriate footballers in Paraguay
Expatriate footballers in Trinidad and Tobago
Expatriate footballers in Honduras
Expatriate footballers in El Salvador